James Bradford Foley (October 18, 1807 – December 5, 1886) was an American politician who served one term as a U.S. Representative from Indiana from 1857 to 1859.

Biography 
Born near Dover, Kentucky, Foley received a limited schooling.
He was employed on a flatboat on the Mississippi River in 1823.
He moved to Greensburg, Indiana, in 1834.
He engaged in mercantile pursuits 1834-1837, and afterwards in farming.
Treasurer of Decatur County 1841-1843.
He served as member of the State constitutional convention in 1850.
He was appointed commander of the Fourth Brigade of State militia in 1852.

Congress 
Foley was elected as a Democrat to the Thirty-fifth Congress (March 4, 1857 – March 3, 1859).

Later career and death 
He resumed agricultural pursuits in Decatur County.

He died in Greensburg, Indiana, December 5, 1886.
He was interred in South Park Cemetery.

References

1807 births
1886 deaths
People from Mason County, Kentucky
Democratic Party members of the United States House of Representatives from Indiana
People from Greensburg, Indiana
19th-century American politicians